The Day the Ponies Come Back is a 2000 French/American film directed by Jerry Schatzberg.

Cast
 Guillaume Canet as Daniel Moulin
 Burt Young as John Stoller
 Monica Trombetta as Tilly DeCruccio
 Nick Sandow as Joey
 Jay Rivera as William
 Tony Lo Bianco as Paul DeCruccio
 Norman Matlock as Cecil Perry
 Lawrence Hoffman as Cop 1
 Bob Cea as Cop #2 (as Robert Cea)
 Vincent D'Arbouze as Teen #1
 Francis Dumaurier as John in the Dumpster
 Ivan Hampden Jr. as Church Drummer
 Jamie Hector as Darryl Boyd
 Ebony Jo-Ann as Beatrice
 Marcia Jean Kurtz as Thelma
 Adriane Lenox as Reverend Grace
 P.J. Marshall as Jon #2
 Shabazz Ray as The Knife Guy (as Shabazz Richardson)
 Delissa Reynolds as Cece
 Francine Roussel as Marie Moulin
 Kevin Sibley as Craig
 Laundrea Thomas as Young Prostitute
 Cheryl Wills as News Reporter

Release
The film premiered at the Montreal World Film Festival on August 27, 2000. It was later released in France on March 21, 2001.

External links

2000 films
2000 drama films
American drama films
French drama films
Films directed by Jerry Schatzberg
English-language French films
2000s English-language films
2000s American films
2000s French films